John Carroll  (January 8, 1735 – December 3, 1815) was an American prelate of the Catholic Church who served as the first bishop and archbishop in the United States. He served as the ordinary of the first diocese and later Archdiocese of Baltimore, in  Maryland, which at first encompassed all of the United States and later after division as the eastern half of the new nation.

Carroll is also known as the founder of Georgetown University (the oldest Catholic college / university in the United States), and of St. John the Evangelist Parish of Rock Creek (now Forest Glen), the first secular parish in the country.

Early life and education

John Carroll was born on January 8, 1735, in Upper Marlborough, Maryland (as it was then spelled), to Daniel Carroll I  and Eleanor (Darnall) Carroll at the large plantation which Eleanor had inherited from her family. He was of Irish ancestry.

He spent his early years at the family home, sited on thousands of acres near Marlborough Town, the county seat of Prince George's County in the Province of Maryland. (Several remnant surrounding acres are now associated with the house museum known as "Darnall's Chance", listed on the National Register of Historic Places and part of the system of the Maryland-National Capital Park and Planning Commission for northern suburban Washington, D.C.).

Other Carroll relatives were instrumental in the development of the colonial Province of Maryland and the establishment of Baltimore (1729), soon to be the third-largest city in America, and developed as a port on the Chesapeake Bay.  His older brother Daniel Carroll II (1730–1796) became one of only five men to sign both the "Articles of Confederation and Perpetual Union" (1778) and the Constitution of the United States (1787). His cousin Charles Carroll of Carrollton (1737–1832) was also an important member of the Revolutionary Patriot cause, and was the last surviving signer of the Declaration of Independence (1776). Charles Carroll lived long enough to participate in the industrial revolution, with the ceremonies of the 1828 setting of the "first stone" for the beginning of the construction of the Baltimore and Ohio Railroad.

John Carroll was schooled at home by his mother, before being sent to a Catholic school at Bohemia Manor in Northeastern Maryland, secretly conducted by Father Thomas Poulton, a Jesuit. At the age of thirteen, he was sent to the College of St. Omer in French Flanders (northern France, bordering southern edge of modern Belgium). (This was established for the education of English Catholics after they suffered discrimination following the Protestant Reformation instituted by King Henry VIII  in England). During the upheavals of the French Revolution (1789–1799), the College migrated to Bruges, and then Liège. It returned to England and was located at  Stonyhurst in 1794, where it remains today.) Also attending St. Omer with him was his cousin Charles, who was to become the only Catholic signatory of the Declaration of Independence, and the first United States Senator (1789) from Maryland.

Jesuit

Carroll joined the Society of Jesus (the Jesuits) as a postulant at the age of 18 in 1753.  In 1755, he began his studies of philosophy and theology at Liège.  After fourteen years, he was ordained to the diaconate and later the priesthood in 1761. Carroll was formally professed as a Jesuit in 1771. Carroll remained in Europe until he was almost 40, teaching at St-Omer and Liège. He also served as chaplain to a British aristocrat traveling on the continent. When Pope Clement XIV suppressed the Society of Jesus in 1773 in Europe, Carroll made arrangements to return to Maryland. The brief suppression of the Jesuits was a painful experience for Carroll, who suspected the Congregation for the Propagation of the Faith of being responsible for this ill-informed decision.  As a result of laws discriminating against Catholics, there was then no public Catholic Church in Maryland. Carroll worked as a missionary in Maryland and Virginia.

In 1774 Carroll founded St. John the Evangelist Parish at Forest Glen (Silver Spring) on land that belonged to his mother. In 1776, the Continental Congress asked Carroll, along with his cousin, delegate Charles Carroll, fellow Marylander Samuel Chase (1741–1811), and Benjamin Franklin (1705/06–1790), to travel north to Montreal in the Saint Lawrence River Valley to try to persuade the French Canadian-majority Province of Quebec to join the Revolution with the lower Thirteen Colonies. The French Canadians had been forced to cede control of their territory in 1763 to the occupying British Army, which won the Seven Years' War, known as the French and Indian War in North America. The Quebec Act of 1774 allowed French Canadians to keep their language, their religion, and much of their law. The group was unsuccessful, but Carroll became known to other early founders of the United States Republic. Snubbed by the local clergy on the orders of Jean-Olivier Briand, Bishop of Quebec, Carroll took an early opportunity to accompany the ailing Franklin back to the colonial capital at Philadelphia.

The Jesuit fathers, led by Carroll, John Ashton, and four other priests, began a series of meetings at White Marsh Manor, at what is now the site of Sacred Heart Church in Bowie, Maryland (Prince George's County, Maryland), beginning on June 27, 1783. Through these General Chapters, they gradually organized the Catholic Church in the United States at White Marsh.

Superior of the Missions
The Catholic clergy at the time of the new Republic were keenly aware that anti-British sentiment made their canonical allegiance to Bishop Richard Challoner, the vicar-apostolic of the London district, somewhat suspect. As a result, they explored various options. When Bishop Challoner died in 1781, his successor, James Talbot, refused to exercise jurisdiction in the new nation. But the American clergy, then numbering some two dozen, did not feel the time was right to have a bishop appointed in the new nation.

The papal nuncio at Versailles Giuseppe Doria Pamphili conferred with the American ambassador in Paris, Benjamin Franklin, as to how the issue might be resolved in a way that would be acceptable to the United States. Franklin responded by saying that the official separation of Church and State in the United States did not permit the government to have any official opinion on who should govern American Catholics. He suggested privately that perhaps a French bishop might be given oversight of the small but growing Catholic community in the U.S.

The nuncio took into account remarks by Franklin of the high esteem he and others had for John Carroll. Carroll was appointed and confirmed by Pope Pius VI on June 9, 1784, as provisional "Superior of the Missions in the thirteen United States of North America", with faculties to celebrate the sacrament of Confirmation. The Holy See made this decision in part because it wanted to please Benjamin Franklin, who had warmly recommended Carroll for the position.

Reforms

Financial reform and lay involvement
Because the U.S. government and state governments did not regulate churches, as was done in nations with established churches, the former British colonists and immigrants who made up the Catholic Church in the new land had varying ideas as to how to structure their local parish communities in this new era. Some set up churches run entirely by laity without Carroll's permission, and in other cases clergy exercised excessive control. Carroll sought to navigate a new way of organizing the Church in a new country, taking into account both the need for lay involvement and a reasonable degree of hierarchical control. In 1791, the formal message of congratulations from American Catholics to President George Washington on his election was co-signed by Carroll and lay Catholics.
Carroll gave also the God's blessing upon him.

Early ecumenical efforts
In his role as the representative of Catholics in the United States, Carroll often wrote articles for publications defending the Catholic tradition against persons who promoted anti-Catholicism in the United States. He fought notions of state establishment of Protestantism as the official religion, but he always treated non-Catholics with respect. He insisted that Catholics and Protestants should work together to build up the new nation. An early advocate of Christian unity, Carroll suggested that the chief obstacles to unity among Christians in the United States were the lack of clarity on the boundaries of papal primacy and the use of Latin in the liturgy.

Bishop

The American clergy, originally reluctant to request the formation of a diocese due to fears of public misunderstanding and the possibility of a foreign bishop being imposed upon them, eventually recognized the need for a Catholic bishop. The election of Samuel Seabury (1729–1796) in 1783 as the first bishop of the Protestant Episcopal Church (the name chosen as the daughter denomination of the Church of England in the former 13 colonies, now original 13 new states, later part of the worldwide Anglican Communion) in the United States had shown that Americans had accepted the appointment of a Protestant bishop.

A year after the end of the American Revolutionary War (1775–1783), on November 26, 1784, the Holy See in Rome established the Apostolic Prefecture of the United States. Carroll, as Prefect Apostolic in February 1785, urged Cardinal Antonelli to create a method of appointing church authorities that would not make it appear as if they were receiving their appointment from a foreign power. A report of the status of Catholics in Maryland was appended to his letter, where he stated that despite there being only nineteen priests in heavily Catholic Maryland, some of the more prominent families were still Catholic in faith. He did say that they may have been prone to dancing and novel-reading. The pope was so pleased with Carroll's report that he granted his request "that the priests in Maryland be allowed to suggest two or three names from which the Pope would choose their bishop".

The priests of Maryland petitioned Rome for a bishop. Cardinal Antonelli replied, allowing the priests to select the city as the site for a cathedral and, for this case only, to name the candidate for presentation to the pope. Carroll was selected Bishop of Baltimore by the clergy of the new independent United States of America in April 1789 by a vote of 24 out of 25. On November 6, 1789, Pope Pius VI approved the election, naming Carroll the first Catholic bishop in the young nation.  He was consecrated by Bishop Charles Walmesley and others on August 15, 1790, in the chapel of Lulworth Castle in Dorset, England, without an oath to the English church. Carroll was invested in his office at the parish of St. Thomas Manor in the south at Charles County, Maryland. After recrossing the North Atlantic Ocean, When he returned to Baltimore, he took his chair in the town's parish Church of St. Peter, which would serve as his pro-cathedral until 1821. This early St. Peter's was also the first Catholic parish in Baltimore Town from two decades earlier in 1770 and was located in a group of red brick structures at the northwest corner of North Charles and West Saratoga streets. It had an attached rectory and school, and was surrounded by a small  cemetery at the heights sloping down to the waterfront harbor to the south and on a cliff overlooking a loop of the Jones Falls stream to the east which divided the town. It would be the site of several Catholic "firsts" in the U.S.A. such as first ordination of a priest and additional bishop to assist Carroll with the growth and administration of the new first Diocese of Baltimore which then encompassed most of the Eastern U.S., and the first diocesan synod gathering of American Catholic priests and deacons.

Coincidentally across the street was Old St. Paul's Protestant Episcopal Church, oldest in the city, established 1692 in southeastern Baltimore County and relocated to the newly founded Baltimore Town a year after its laying out in 1729–1730, representing the established state Church of England (Anglicanism).

Founding of Georgetown University
Among the major educational concerns of Carroll were the education of the faithful, providing proper training for priests, and the inclusion of women in higher education (something to which he had encountered resistance). As a result, Carroll orchestrated the founding and early development of Georgetown College (later University) west of the rough village of Washington in the newly designated Federal national capital in the District of Columbia. Administration of the school was entrusted to the religious and teaching order of the Jesuits. Instruction at the school began on November 22, 1791, under the direction of its first academic President, Robert Plunkett, with future U.S. Representative  (Congressman) William Gaston as its first student.

First diocesan synod in the United States
That first year of 1791, Carroll convened the first diocesan synod in the United States. The twenty-two priests (of five different nationalities) at the First Synod of Baltimore discussed baptism, confirmation, penance, the celebration of the liturgy in the Mass and prayer services of the hours, anointing of the sick, mixed marriages and supplemental legislation concerning things such as the rules of fasting and abstinence. The decrees of this synod represent the first local canonical legislation in the new nation. Among the regulations were that parish income should be divided in thirds: one third for the economic support of the clergy, one third for the maintenance of church facilities, and one third for the support of the poor.

Religious in the diocese
To train priests for his nationwide diocese, Carroll had asked the Fathers of the Company of Saint Sulpice to come to Baltimore. They arrived in 1791 and started the nucleus of St. Mary's College and Seminary, Baltimore. Carroll gave his approval to the founding of Visitation nuns. In 1799, under the direction of Carroll's future  successor Leonard Neale, the nuns founded Visitation Academy in Georgetown. He was not successful, however, in inducing the Carmelites, who had come to Maryland in 1790, to take up the work of education.

In 1796, Irish Augustinian friars came to Philadelphia.  Carroll took the lead in effecting a restoration of the Society of Jesus in Maryland in 1805, without informing Rome, by an affiliation with the Russian Jesuits. They had been protected from suppression by Catherine the Great. That same year Carroll urged English Dominican friars to begin a priory and college in Kentucky to serve the numerous Maryland Catholics migrating there. In 1809 the Sulpicians invited Elizabeth Ann Seton to come to Emmitsburg, Maryland, to found a school. Carroll had to contend with a "medley of clerical characters". One of the most notorious was Simon Felix Gallagher of Charleston, an eloquent alcoholic with a large following.

Construction of the first cathedral in the United States
In 1806, Carroll oversaw the construction of the first cathedral, the Cathedral of the Assumption (today called the Basilica of the National Shrine of the Assumption of the Blessed Virgin Mary) in Baltimore. It was designed by Benjamin Henry Latrobe, architect of the United States Capitol. The cornerstone of the cathedral was laid on July 7, 1806, by Carroll, but he did not live to see its completion.

Elevation to archbishop
In 1804 Carroll was given administration of the Danish West Indies and other nearby islands that were under no ecclesiastical jurisdiction and in 1805 the Louisiana Territory was added. In April 1808, Pope Pius VII made Baltimore the first archdiocese in the United States, with jurisdiction in Boston, New York, Philadelphia, and Bardstown. Archbishop Carroll made three new bishops in 1810, after which an unofficial provincial council lasted for two weeks.

Later life and death
Carroll was elected a member of the American Antiquarian Society in July 1815.  He died in Baltimore on December 3, 1815.  His remains are interred in the crypt of the Basilica of the National Shrine of the Assumption of the Blessed Virgin Mary, which can be visited by the public.

Early support for a vernacular liturgy
Carroll was dedicated to the wider readership of Scripture among the Catholics of the United States. He insisted that the readings of the liturgy be read in the vernacular. He was a tireless promoter of "The Carey Bible", an edition of the English-language Douay-Rheims translation that was published in sections. He encouraged clergy and laity to purchase subscriptions so that they could read the Scriptures.

As both superior of the missions and bishop, Carroll instituted a series of broad reforms in the Church, especially regarding the conduct of the clergy. He promoted the use of vernacular languages in the liturgy, but was unable to gain the support for such reform by the church hierarchy. In 1787 he wrote:
Can there be anything more preposterous than an unknown tongue; and in this country either for want of books or inability to read, the great part of our congregations must be utterly ignorant of the meaning and sense of the public office of the Church. It may have been prudent, for aught I know, to impose a compliance in this matter with the insulting and reproachful demands of the first reformers; but to continue the practice of the Latin liturgy in the present state of things must be owing either to chimerical fears of innovation or to indolence and inattention in the first pastors of the national Churches in not joining to solicit or indeed ordain this necessary alteration. It would be nearly 200 years until Carroll's wish for vernacular language-liturgy was realized in the United States as a result of the Second Vatican Council, praised by some, criticized by others.

Attitudes toward slavery
According to recent investigations by Georgetown and John Caroll University, John Caroll owned two slaves, Charles and Alexis. In his will, Carroll bequeathed Charles to his nephew Daniel Brent, on the condition that Brent free Charles within a year. Carroll also provided Charles with a small inheritance. Alexis was sold in 1806 to a wealthy Baltimore man named Mr. Stenson.

While calling for the humane treatment and religious education of slaves, he never agitated for the abolition of slavery.

Over the course of his life, Carroll's attitude toward slavery evolved from a paternalistic advocacy for humane treatment and religious instruction of slaves to a policy of gradual emancipation (albeit through manumission by masters rather than by law). His view was that gradual emancipation of a plantation's slaves allowed for families to be kept together and for elderly slaves to be provided for. He addressed critics of his approach thus:
Since the great stir raised in England about Slavery, my Brethren being anxious to suppress censure, which some are always glad to affix to the priesthood, have begun some years ago, and are gradually proceeding to emancipate the old population on their estates. To proceed at once to make it a general measure, would not be either humanity toward the Individuals, nor doing justice to the trust, under which the estates have been transmitted and received.

Legacy

 John Carroll University, a Jesuit university in University Heights, Ohio
 Archbishop Carroll High School (Radnor, Pennsylvania)
 Archbishop Carroll High School (Washington, DC)
 Bishop Carroll High School (Wichita, Kansas)
 Archbishop Carroll High School (Dayton, Ohio)
 John Carroll Catholic High School (Fort Pierce, Florida)
 John Carroll Catholic High School (Birmingham, AL) 
 The John Carroll School, Bel Air, Maryland
 John Carroll Society, an organization for Catholic professional laypersons in the service of the archbishop of the Archdiocese of Washington
Bishop John Carroll statue at Georgetown University
 John J. Carroll Institute on Church and Social Issues (JJICSI)
 Carroll Square, a trophy class office building located at 975 F Street NW in Washington DC.  The building is situated on land owned by the Catholic Archdiocese of Washington and is next door to the historic St. Patrick's Catholic Church.
 Father Lemke founded the Pennsylvania borough of Carrolltown, named it after Carroll.
 Mass for John Carroll, a popular Mass setting by J. Michael Joncas in honor of Carroll published in 1990, and its 2012 revision New Mass for John Carroll, published in response to the transition to the Third Edition (2010) of the Roman Missal, which retranslated the Ordinary Form of the Mass of Pope Paul VI into English from the Latin.

See also

 Apostolic succession
 Carroll family
 Catholic Church hierarchy
 Catholic Church in the United States
 Historical list of the Catholic bishops of the United States
 List of the Catholic bishops of the United States
 Lists of patriarchs, archbishops, and bishops

Notes

References

Citations

Sources 

 
Breidenbach, Michael D. (2013), 'Conciliarism and American Religious Liberty, 1632–1835' (Ph.D. Dissertation, University of Cambridge)

External links
 Basilica of the National Shrine of the Assumption of the Blessed Virgin Mary
 Archdiocese of Baltimore
 Pastoral letter of 1792
 John Carroll University

1735 births
1815 deaths
18th-century American Jesuits
19th-century American Jesuits
American people of English descent
American people of Irish descent
American slave owners
18th-century Roman Catholic bishops in the United States
Apostolic prefects
Roman Catholic archbishops of Baltimore
Burials at the Basilica of the National Shrine of the Assumption of the Blessed Virgin Mary
John
Clergy in the American Revolution
Georgetown University people
History of Catholicism in the United States
People from Upper Marlboro, Maryland
University and college founders
Members of the American Antiquarian Society
19th-century Roman Catholic archbishops in the United States